Judith of Flanders (circa 843 – after 879) was a Carolingian princess as the daughter of Charles II, Emperor of the Romans ("Charles the Bald"), who became Queen (consort) of Wessex by two successive marriages and later Margravine (consort) of Flanders.

Ancestry and early life 

Judith was born around 843 or in early 844 as the eldest child of Charles II, King of West Francia ("Charles the Bald"; 823–877) and his first wife Ermentrude of Orléans (823–869) and was named after her paternal grandmother, Judith of Bavaria, Empress of the Romans (797–843). She was a great-granddaughter of Charlemagne (747–814). Judith had nine younger full siblings and five half-siblings from her father's second marriage, but three of her full siblings and all of her half-siblings were born after she had been married off and left her home for Wessex.

Queen of Wessex

First marriage and coronation
In 855, the widower Æthelwulf, King of Wessex (died 858) made a pilgrimage to Rome with his youngest son Alfred (848/849–899). On the way there, he visited the court of Charles the Bald and negotiated for a marriage with 12-year-old Judith, despite probably being in his mid-fifties and having six children, three or five of them older than Judith. He was looking for an ally as both he and Charles suffered from Viking attacks. Marrying into the prestigious Carolingian dynasty was an additional advantage for Æthelwulf. 

On the way back, in 856, he stayed at the Charles' court again, and married Judith on 1 October 856 at the royal palace of Verberie-sur-Oise. This was an extraordinary event as Carolingian princesses rarely married and were usually sent to convents. It was practically unprecedented for them to marry foreigners. During the ceremony, which was celebrated by Hincmar, archbishop of Rheims, the bride put on a wedding ring and was presented with magnificent gifts. As a part of the ritual, Judith was crowned and anointed with myrrh. Æthelwulf honoured his bride by calling her queen after the ceremony. According to the customs of Wessex, the wife of a king could not be called queen or sit on the throne with her husband. However, all chroniclers pay attention to the fact that Charles the Bald insisted on the coronation of his daughter, probably wishing to secure her position in her new home:

 

After the celebrations, Æthelwulf, his new wife and his son returned to Wessex. Judith, a well-educated lady like most Frankish princesses of the time, probably brought the "aura of the Carolingian monarchy" to the court of Wessex.Back in his kingdom, Æthelwulf faced difficulties: his eldest surviving son, Æthelbald, supported by Eahlstan, Bishop of Sherborne and Eanwulf, Ealdorman of Somerset, were conspiring to dethrone him. The marriage with Judith may have played a role in this as Æthelbald probably feared that his father's young wife, the great-granddaughter of Charlemagne, would give birth to a higher-born heir than himself. In addition, some of the nobles were outraged that Judith was crowned and called queen, contrary to local custom. 

According to other explanations, Æthelbald had already been rebelling before his father's new marriage, and this was why Æthelwulf stayed at the court of Charles the Bald and married his daughter, demonstrating to his subjects that he had strong supporters abroad. In the end, father and son negotiated a compromise under which Æthelwulf kept the eastern districts of the kingdom and Æthelbald received the western. It is not known whether this meant that Æthelwulf took Kent and Æthelbald Wessex, or Wessex itself was divided.

Judith had no children from Æthelwulf, who died on 13 January 858.

Controversial second marriage

 
Upon the death of Æthelwulf, Æthelbald succeeded him on the throne of Wessex and married his stepmother. By agreeing to this marriage, Judith may have tried to avoid the usual fate of widows, being sent to a convent. To Æthelbald, this marriage was advantageous because of Judith's belonging to the Carolingian dynasty and allowed him to enhance his status, placing him above his brothers. Judith's name appears in several charters during the reign of Æthelbald, which confirms her continued exceptional status. Asser, Bishop of Sherborne condemned the marriage in his Life of Alfred the Great: 

Asser's additional comment on the "great disgrace" was not reflected in contemporary Frankish records. His assertion that marriage is contrary to even pagan practice is refuted by the marriage of Eadbald, King of Kent (died 640) to his father's widow Emma of Austrasia in 616. Judith was still childless when Æthelbald died on 20 December 860, after a reign and marriage of two and a half years.

Third marriage

Kidnapping or elopement

Æthelbald's death left Judith with no future in Wessex. She was still no more than seventeen years old and childless. According to the Annales Bertiniani and Flodoard, she 

According to the most likely account, a certain Count Baldwin (born probably in the 830s – 879), traditionally regarded as the son of a forester called Odoacre visited the monastery in 861, and according to the Encyclopedia Britannica, he fell in love with Judith. There are claims that he had already been interested in her before her first marriage. Around the Christmas of 861, or in early 862, Judith either fled with Baldwin or was kidnapped by him. According to one contemporary source, Judith was not abducted but eloped with the consent of her brother Louis:

Flodoard's description is similar: 

 

The couple probably married in the monastery of Senlis before eloping.

Excommunication
Judith's father was furious because of the kidnapping/elopement. He immediately organised search parties to bring her home and capture Baldwin. Flodoard mentioned a letter from Archbishop Hincmar of Reims to Bishop Hunger of Utrecht in which he informed Hunger of Baldwin's excommunication for kidnapping Judith and marrying her without royal consent. Contemporary chronicles state that in 862 Charles the Bald held a council with the bishops and nobles of his kingdom. According to Hincmar, the king ordered (or, by Flodoard's account, asked) the bishops to pass a canonical verdict on Baldwin and Judith, as commanded by the decrees of Pope Gregory II: “if anyone marries, having kidnapped a widow, let him be anathematized himself, as well as those who contributed to this”. Judith's brother Louis was also punished by imprisonment in the Abbey of Saint Martin.

Meanwhile, Judith and Baldwin sought refuge with the Viking Rorik of Dorestad, King of Friesland (circa 810 – circa 880) and later fled to the court of Judith's paternal cousin Lothair II, King of Lotharingia. Eventually, they travelled to Rome in order to plead their case to Pope Nicholas I.

Reconciliation with her father
In Rome, Judith and Baldwin negotiated with the pope. He listened to their arguments and sent his legates Radoald, Bishop of Porto and John, Bishop of Cervia to her father. They asked Charles to recognize the marriage as legally binding and welcome the young couple, but Charles and Archbishop Hincmar were not easy to convince. In a letter dated to 23 November 862, the Pope expressed his fear that Baldwin might had already joined forces with the "Jute prince Rorik". Rorik had already fought against King Charles on the side of his brother Lothair I, then-Emperor of the Romans (795–855). According to Flodoard, in 863 

 

According to the later chronicler Albert of Stade, Bishop Hunger turned to Rorik urging him not to provide any support to Baldwin.

Eventually, King Charles the Bald reluctantly forgave the couple and allowed them to marry. They returned to West Francia and were officially married at Auxerre on 13 December 862 or in 863. The king was not present, but gave Baldwin the March of Flanders, making him a peer of the kingdom. Not much later, he also gave him Ternois, Waas and the lay abbacy of Saint Peter in Ghent.

Margravine of Flanders 
Some scholars have suggested that the king hoped for Baldwin's early death by giving him land just south of the Scheldt river, a region frequently attacked by the Vikings. Baldwin, however, managed the situation well, successfully quelling the Viking threat, earning the nickname of "Iron"from his contemporaries, which later generations replaced with the nickname "Iron Hand". He expanded both his army and his territory quickly and became a faithful supporter of his father-in-law. His possessions would become known as the County of Flanders, one of the most powerful domains in France.

Baldwin chose a small island in Flanders as his residence, formed at the confluence of the Boterbeke and Roya rivers. There stood a fortress, possibly built by Vikings, surrounded by a small number of huts, named Bruggia. As it was in ruins, Baldwin built a new fortress with a personal residence, a chapel, houses for the servants and a cathedral where the relics of Saint Donatian of Reims were placed. The home of Judith and Baldwin stood where now the Palace of Justice and the Town Hall are, and the cathedral was located on the north side of the current Palace of Justice. It included a mint and was surrounded by a high wall with four gates, fortified with rising lattices and drawbridges. Ruins of buildings still remain, including what probably used to be the baptismal chapel behind the crypt of Saint Basil. 
Judith had children from her third marriage, at least three sons and maybe two daughters. The exact date of her death is unknown, but it is believed to have happened no earlier than 870. Between 893 and 899, her eldest surviving son Baldwin II married Ælfthryth, daughter of Alfred the Great, King of the Anglo-Saxons (previously King of Wessex), son of Judith's first husband and brother of the second. If Judith was alive at this time, she probably played an instrumental role in the marriage negotiations due to her knowledge of the Wessex court. Judith's husband Baldwin died in 879 in Arras and was buried in the Abbey of Saint-Bertin near Saint-Omer.

Legacy
Judith's marital history was considered scandalous and a violation of church rules by her contemporaries. In the middle of the 10th century, however, she was described by the compilers of the genealogy of the counts of Flanders as "the wisest and most beautiful", the woman who brought Carolingian blood to the comital dynasty, while her scandalous stories were omitted. The anointing and coronation of Judith as Queen of Wessex allowed the restoration of the status of wives of kings and improved their position.

Issue
From her marriage with Baldwin I of Flanders, Judith had at least three sons:

 Charles (c. 864/865 – died young), named after his maternal grandfather.  He was recorded as "Karolus brevis vite" in the list of counts of Flanders in the Cartulaire de Saint-Bertin. It is usually assumed that Charles died young, as no other reference to him has been found.
 Baldwin (c. 865/867 – c. 10 September 918), named after his father and succeeded him in 879 as Baldwin II, Margrave of Flanders. He married Ælfthryth of Wessex between 893 and 899.
 Ralph (c. 867/870 – murdered 17 June 896), recorded as "Rodolphus Cameracensis comes" in the Cartulaire de Saint-Bertin. He was installed as Count of Cambrai around 888 and killed by Herbert I of Vermandois.

In addition, two daughters are sometimes attributed to Judith and Baldwin, although both of these accounts should be treated with caution as they are based on unreliable sources:

 The mother of Walter. The History of Waulsort Monastery speaks of a "Walterus...Rodulfi sororis filius" (Walter, son of Ralph's sister), recording that he attempted to avenge the death of his maternal uncle, Ralph of Cambrai. No other reference to this person has been found and.
 Guinidilde or Gunhild (died before 19 February 904), who married Wilfred the Hairy, Count of Barcelona before 27 June 875. According to Allison Weir, this parentage is confirmed in the Gestis Comitum Barcinonensium, which records that Charles the Bald gave an unnamed daughter of the count of Flanders in marriage to a certain Pilosi at the same time as granting him the County of Barcelona.

Notes

Bibliography
 
 
 
 
 
 
 
 
 Humble, Richard. The Saxon Kings. London: Weidenfeld and Nicolson, 1980

External links 

 
 Britannica entry on Judith's third husband, Baldwin I of Flanders
 
 
 
 

840s births
Carolingian dynasty
Anglo-Saxon royal consorts
Countesses of Flanders
9th-century English people
9th-century English women
Year of death unknown
Frankish princesses
House of Wessex
Women from the Carolingian Empire
Remarried royal consorts
Daughters of emperors
Daughters of kings